The 1952 NCAA Tennis Championships were the 7th annual tournaments to determine the national champions of NCAA men's singles, doubles, and team collegiate tennis in the United States.

UCLA won the team championship, the Bruins' second title. UCLA finished six points ahead of rivals USC and California (11–5) in the team standings.

Host site
This year's tournaments were contested at the Vandy Christie Tennis Center at Northwestern University in Evanston, Illinois.

Team scoring
Until 1977, the men's team championship was determined by points awarded based on individual performances in the singles and doubles events.

References

External links
List of NCAA Men's Tennis Champions

NCAA Division I tennis championships
NCAA Division I Tennis Championships
NCAA Division I Tennis Championships